Bruna Kuroiwa Yamamoto Leal (born ) is a Brazilian female artistic gymnast and part of the national team.

She participated at the 2012 Summer Olympics in London, United Kingdom.

References

External links
https://www.youtube.com/watch?v=sjmeahizp9I
http://braziliangymnastics.blogspot.com/
https://thecscore.wordpress.com/2009/06/04/cbg-wants-barbosa-back/
http://www.intlgymnast.com/index.php?option=com_content&view=article&id=3329:contract-squabble-costs-barbosa-olympic-appearance&catid=92:2012-olympic-news&Itemid=242

1993 births
Living people
Brazilian female artistic gymnasts
Gymnasts at the 2012 Summer Olympics
Olympic gymnasts of Brazil
Place of birth missing (living people)
Gymnasts at the 2011 Pan American Games
South American Games gold medalists for Brazil
South American Games silver medalists for Brazil
South American Games bronze medalists for Brazil
South American Games medalists in gymnastics
Competitors at the 2010 South American Games
Pan American Games competitors for Brazil
Sportspeople from Belém
21st-century Brazilian women